Douglas Jung  (February 25, 1924 – January 4, 2002) was a Canadian lawyer, politician, military officer, and Special Operations Executive secret agent. A Conservative, he was the first member of a visible minority elected to the Parliament of Canada, as well as the first Canadian Member of Parliament (MP) of Chinese and Asian descent in the House of Commons of Canada.

Early life, military career and education
Douglas Jung was born in Victoria, British Columbia, on February 25, 1924. During his childhood, the Government of Canada passed numerous pieces of legislation that disenfranchised Chinese in Canada. Jung and a group of young men from British Columbia enlisted in the Canadian Army during World War II in order to change the status of Chinese Canadians. Jung explained his reasons for enlisting as: "Some of us realized that unless we volunteered to serve Canada during this hour of need, we would be in a very difficult position after the war ended to demand our rights as Canadian citizens because the Canadian government would say to us, "What did you do during the war when everybody else was out fighting for Canada? What did you do?" So a few of us volunteered to serve, and my group was probably the first to join up."

World War II 
Although Jung enlisted in the Canadian Army in 1939, he did not receive his first assignment until 1944, mainly because politicians in Ottawa and Victoria did not want to deal with the issues of enfranchising the Chinese after the war. However, Winston Churchill's wartime Special Operations Executive recruited Jung and a group of Chinese-Canadian soldiers into Force 136, a team of secret agents who deployed to British Malaya to train local guerrillas to resist the Japanese Imperial Army occupying Malaya and Singapore. The mission for the Asian Canadian soldiers was known as Operation Oblivion. They received parachute training at Australia and prepared themselves to fight in South West Pacific. However, the operation came to an abrupt cancellation. Jung instead deployed to Japanese-occupied British Borneo and New Guinea, and lead his troops in search and rescue missions.

Post-WWII 
After the war, Chinese in Canada were enfranchised in 1947. Veterans Affairs Canada provided funds so that Jung and his Chinese-Canadian comrades could obtain a university education. Jung graduated from the University of British Columbia in 1953 with Bachelor of Arts and Bachelor of Laws degrees. He was called to the British Columbia Bar in 1954.

Political career
Douglas Jung joined the Progressive Conservative Party in the early 1950s. He had vowed not to join the Liberal Party of Canada because of its racist legislation against Chinese in the past. Jung was elected as an MP in 1957, representing the riding of Vancouver Centre, under the John Diefenbaker government. In his maiden speech in the House of Commons, he urged Canada to take a leading role in serving as a bridge to the Pacific Rim countries.

Jung's other achievements include taking part in the debate on the implementation in 1960 by the Hon. Ellen Fairclough, Minister of Citizenship and Immigration, of the Chinese Adjustment Statement Program that granted amnesty to illegal immigrants from Hong Kong, also known as "Paper Sons". He also represented Canada in the United Nations as an alternate member of the Legal Delegation to the United Nations (Source: Department of Foreign Affairs).

His profusion of honours included the Order of Canada and the Order of British Columbia, the highest honours a citizen can receive from the federal and provincial governments, respectively. Other awards came from the Chinese Benevolent Association, S.U.C.C.E.S.S. Chinese Cultural Centre, Chinese Canadian National Council and Chinese Association in Moose Jaw, Saskatchewan, Thunder Bay and Toronto, Ontario, as well as the Quebec Japanese Canadian Citizenship Association in Montreal.

Other achievements

Jung was also a prominent figure in the community, especially the Vancouver Chinese community. They include: Life President of Army Navy Air Force Veterans in Canada Unit #280, Patron of S.U.C.C.E.S.S.: Director of the Vancouver Symphony. B.C.: Deputy Director of the Governor General's 1992 Regional Celebration of Canada 125th Anniversary. Director of the Far East Relations of the Former Parliamentarians Association and the President of Japan Karate Association of Canada, which awarded him a sixth degree Black Belt.

On September 7, 2007, the Hon. Jason Kenney, Secretary of State (Multiculturalism and Canadian Identity) announced that the federal building located at 401 Burrard Street in Vancouver would be named after Douglas Jung, as the first Chinese-Canadian elected to Parliament.

Death
While marching with fellow veterans in 1995, Jung suffered a serious heart attack. He never completely recovered and died in 2002 due to related complications.

See also
 Electoral firsts in Canada

References

External links
 Chinese Canadian Military Museum Society
 Burma Star Association
 
 Order of Canada Citation
 "Douglas Jung" (Archive). Veterans Affairs Canada.
 Hawthorn, Tom. "Jung, Douglas Class of '41" (Archive). The Globe and Mail. February 2, 2002.

1924 births
2002 deaths
Canadian military personnel from British Columbia
Canadian politicians of Chinese descent
Lawyers in British Columbia
Members of the Order of British Columbia
Members of the Order of Canada
Members of the House of Commons of Canada from British Columbia
Peter A. Allard School of Law alumni
Politicians from Victoria, British Columbia
Progressive Conservative Party of Canada MPs
University of British Columbia alumni
Canadian Army officers
Special Operations Executive personnel
Canadian Army personnel of World War II